David Masondo (born 11 November 1974 in Vhembe District, Limpopo) is a South African politician. Masondo is the current Deputy Minister of Finance for the Republic of South Africa.

Education 
Masondo attended Wits University, Johannesburg where he studied Arts and graduated with a Master of Arts with Honours. In 2013 he obtained a PhD in Political Economy from New York University, where he wrote a dissertation entitled Post-Apartheid Business Nanny State: Case Study of the Motor Industry Development Programme (MIDP), 1995-2010 under the supervision of Vivek Chibber, Jeff Goodwin, and Steven Lukes.

Career 
David Masondo was the Chief Director for Economic Sectors and Industry; he also served as Chief Executive Officer of the Automotive Industry Development Center at the Gauteng Provincial Government. He has also served as the Director in the Local Government Department in Limpopo and Finance MEC. On May 30, 2019 he was appointed Deputy Minister of Finance in South Africa.

References 

Living people
1974 births
People from Limpopo
21st-century South African politicians
Members of the National Assembly of South Africa
Members of the Limpopo Provincial Legislature